Aliabad (also Romanized as ‘Alīābād) is a village in Kharqan Rural District, Bastam District, Shahrud County, Semnan Province, Iran. At the 2006 census, its population was 372, in 114 families.

References 

Populated places in Shahrud County